Neil Arksey is a British writer, known both for his work in TV drama and for his novels for Middle Grade, teenage and Young Adult readers, published by Penguin Books and Random House.

Career
Early in his career he helped develop Little Robots, a pre-school TV show broadcast on BBC in the United Kingdom. He went on to write scripts for Little Robots as well as a number of other shows aimed at the same age-group including Kipper the Dog.

As a story editor, script editor, head writer and producer Arksey has worked on a number of UK soaps and drama series Crossroads (TV series), River City, Family Affairs and Mile High. He has also worked as head writer/producer on TV drama series in other European countries including Salatut Elämät in Finland and Jobán Rosszban in Hungary.

He worked as a screenwriter and producer on the feature film Run To Ground, a dark thriller set and shot in Miskolc, eastern Hungary.

His book, Intelligent Life, received considerable acclaim from a number of top scientists.

Arksey teaches writing at CityLit., London Film School and Brunel University.

Books 
 Brooksie
 Result!
 Flint
 MacB
 Playing On The Edge (shortlisted for the Blue Peter Book Awards 2001)
 Sudden Death
 As Good As Dead In Downtown
 Intelligent Life
 Alltalk
Shoot

References

External links 
Neil Arksey's Official Website
Neil Arksey at the Internet Movie Database

21st-century British novelists
British male screenwriters
Living people
British male novelists
British children's writers
British writers of young adult literature
21st-century British male writers
Screenwriting instructors
Year of birth missing (living people)
21st-century British screenwriters